Peter Arthur Oosterhuis (born 3 May 1948) is an English professional golfer and golf broadcaster. Oosterhuis played on the European circuit from 1969 to 1974, winning 10 tournaments and taking the Harry Vardon Trophy for heading the Order of Merit for four consecutive seasons from 1971 to 1974. From 1975 he played on the PGA Tour, winning the Canadian Open in 1981. He was twice runner-up in the Open Championship, in 1974 and 1982. Later he became a golf analyst on TV, initially in Europe and then in the United States. In 2015, Oosterhuis announced that he had Alzheimer's disease.

Early years, amateur golf
Oosterhuis was born in London and educated at Dulwich College. He won the 1966 Berkshire Trophy by a stroke from Michael Bonallack, after a final round 67 which included nine 3s in 11 holes, with seven 3s in succession. Later in 1966 he won the British Youths Open Amateur Championship by four strokes. He represented Great Britain in the 1967 Walker Cup. Playing with Ronnie Shade in the foursomes they halved one match and won the other. However, Oosterhuis lost both his singles matches. He also played in the 1968 Eisenhower Trophy where Great Britain and Ireland won the silver medal. Great Britain and Ireland led the United States by 7 strokes after three rounds, but the Americans scored 73, 73 and 75 in the final round to Great Britain and Ireland's 76, 76, and 77 to win by a stroke. Oosterhuis turned professional in November 1968.

European Tour
Oosterhuis played on the European circuit in the early years of his professional career, from 1969 to 1974, winning the Harry Vardon Trophy (the Order of Merit title) four consecutive times from 1971 to 1974.

In 1969, his rookie season, he started the season by winning the Sunningdale Foursomes, playing with the amateur Peter Benka, and finished runner-up in the Gor-Ray Under-24 Championship. He was awarded the Sir Henry Cotton Rookie of the Year award. In 1970 Oosterhuis won two age-restricted events, Lord Derby’s Under-23 Professional Tournament and the Coca-Cola Young Professionals' Championship. Later in the season he finished tied for sixth in the Open Championship, and third in the Dunlop Masters. Oosterhuis had won the General Motors Open in South Africa in February, an event which served as the South African qualifier for the Alcan Golfer of the Year Championship. He finished tied for third place in that event with Neil Coles and Lee Trevino, winning £2,487.

Oosterhuis won his first important British event, the Agfa-Gevaert Tournament, in May 1971 and followed this up by winning the Sunbeam Electric Tournament and the Piccadilly Medal later in the season. These, together a number of other high finishes, including being runner-up in the Carroll's International and the Dunlop Masters, gave Oosterhuis the Order of Merit title with 1292.5 points, beating Neil Coles who finished just 7 points behind. 1972 was the first year of the European tour. Oosterhuis won the Penfold-Bournemouth Tournament and the Coca-Cola Young Professionals' Championship, a non-tour event. He was runner-up in the Dutch Open, the Viyella PGA Championship and the John Player Classic. He won the Order of Merit title with 1751 points, ahead of Guy Hunt on 1710, although his performances in the big money events put him well ahead as the leading money winner with £18,525.

Oosterhuis won three European tour events in 1973: the Piccadilly Medal, French Open and Viyella PGA Championship. He was also runner-up in the Sunbeam Electric Scottish Open and Dutch Open. He won the Order of Merit again, with 3440 points, 460 points ahead of Maurice Bembridge. He won £17,455 in official tour events, second behind Tony Jacklin. Oosterhuis won three more European tour events in 1974: the French Open and the last two tournaments of the season, the Italian Open and El Paraiso Open. In addition he was runner-up in five other events, including the Open Championship, and was third in three more, finishing outside the top three only twice during the European Tour season. He won the Order of Merit for the fourth time, nearly 600 points ahead of second-place Dale Hayes.

Although he played on the PGA Tour from 1975, Oosterhuis made regular visits to play in the Open Championship and occasionally other European Tour events. He was runner-up in the 1977 Penfold PGA Championship, the 1981 Bob Hope British Classic, and the 1982 Open Championship.

South African Tour
After turning professional Oosterhuis played in his first professional tournament in South Africa in January 1969. He played regularly in South Africa from the 1968/69 season until the 1973/74 season.

PGA Tour
Oosterhuis made his debut on the PGA Tour at the 1971 Greater Greensboro Open, the week before competing in his first Masters. In 1973 Oosterhuis led the Masters Tournament after three rounds before finishing third. In the 1974 Monsanto Open, Oosterhuis lost in a playoff to Lee Elder. This was a historic event as it assured that Elder, an African-American, would be the first black man to play at the Masters. Oosterhuis was not a member of the PGA Tour at this point; he played all of these events on sponsor exemptions.

In 1974 Oosterhuis entered the qualification process to become a full-time member of the PGA Tour. In November, he finished fourth in the 144-hole PGA Tour Qualifying school, earning his card for the 1975 season. There were high hopes for Oosterhuis' success on the PGA Tour. He was ranked No. 7 in the world less than a year before joining the PGA Tour and had just won the European Tour Order of Merit for the fourth consecutive time weeks before entering Q-school. He made his debut as a tour player in the opening event of the season, the Phoenix Open. He recorded a second-place finish at First NBC New Orleans Open to Billy Casper. He was also in contention for the U.S. Open on the last day. He was four shots back in a 4-way tie for 4th place as he entered the final round. The leaders struggled, however, and Oosterhuis' even-par golf through the first 8 holes was nearly enough to catch them. However, he made four consecutive bogeys in the middle of the round to abruptly eliminate his chances. He would still finish only two back, in a tie for seventh. Oosterhuis also recorded one other top-10 in 1975. His overall record for the year was 28 starts with 24 made cuts along with 3 top-10s and 10 top-25s. Although he did not quite meet the level of success he achieved in the early 1970s, it was nonetheless a promising start on the more challenging American tour.

Oosterhuis did not progress on this performance, however. Through the late 1970s he would easily keep his Tour card, but was not a regular contender to win events on the PGA Tour. His year-end statistics through the late 1970s are remarkably similar to his 1975 results. In 1976, he made the cut in 25 of 29 events with 3 top-10s and 11 top-25s. In 1977, he made 18 of 25 cuts with 3 top-10s and 9 top-25s, including a runner-up finish at the Canadian Open, his third and final runner-up finish on tour. In 1978, he recorded 20 made cuts in 24 events with, for the fourth straight year, 3 top-10s as well as 6 top-25s.

Oosterhuis' career in America reached its nadir in the summer of 1981. He hadn't recorded a top-10 in over a year. He barely kept his card the previous year, finishing #107 on the money list. He had gotten some advice, however, from former pro and instructor Bert Yancey which "helped immensely." This work eventually paid off as he won the Canadian Open in August 1981. It would be his only PGA Tour win. He defeated Andy North, Bruce Lietzke, and Jack Nicklaus by a shot. Nicklaus had a 20-foot eagle putt on the last hole to tie but missed. He would build on this success, recording 4 top-10s and 13 top-25s in 1982, both his best ever for the PGA Tour. He would also finish runner-up at the 1982 Open Championship.

The remainder of Oosterhuis' career was not quite as successful. He would record a handful of top-10s before quitting life as a touring professional after the 1986 season.

Ryder Cup
Oosterhuis played on six consecutive Ryder Cup teams for Great Britain and Ireland, and later Europe, from 1971 to 1981. Representing Great Britain and Ireland from 1971 to 1977 he had an impressive record, especially in singles matches. In 1971 he beat Gene Littler and Arnold Palmer, in 1973 he halved with Lee Trevino and beat Palmer again, in 1975 he beat Johnny Miller and J. C. Snead while in 1977 he beat Jerry McGee. At that time he had a singles record of 6 wins, a half and no losses. Although he lost his singles matches, playing for Europe, in his final two Ryder Cup matches, he finished with a 6–2–1 record in singles and with 6½ points is only ½ point behind the overall Ryder Cup singles record of 7 points held by 5 players including Arnold Palmer. Palmer had only three losses in 11 singles matches, two of them by Oosterhuis, the other being by Peter Alliss in 1963. In all matches Oosterhuis had a winning 14–11–3 record in the Ryder Cup, despite being on the losing side on all six occasions.

Club professional
From 1987 to 1993, he was Director of Golf at Forsgate Country Club in Jamesburg, New Jersey, and at the Riviera Country Club in Pacific Palisades, California.

Broadcasting career
In 1994, Oosterhuis was hired to cover the PGA Tour by Britain's Sky Sports and covered the Open Championship for the BBC in 1996 and 1997. From 1995 to 1997, he was the lead analyst for the Golf Channel's coverage of the European Tour.

In 1997, Oosterhuis joined the CBS Sports announcer team part-time, working five events including the Masters and the PGA Championship. In 1998, he joined the CBS golf team full-time. Oosterhuis has also worked on early-round coverage when CBS was covering the weekend, fulfilling this role for ESPN (2003–2006), Golf Channel (1998–2002, 2007–2014), and USA Network (1997–2007). In 2010, Oosterhuis began to work part-time for CBS, again calling about five events per year including the Masters and PGA Championship. Oosterhuis retired from broadcasting following the 2014 PGA Championship due to health concerns stemming from early-onset Alzheimer's disease.

Oosterhuis called the action at Augusta National's par 4 17th hole for 18 straight years from 1997 through 2014.

Personal
Oosterhuis lives in Charlotte, North Carolina, in the United States with his second wife, Ruth Ann. He is a member of the Quail Hollow Golf Club there. His son Rob is also a professional golfer.

In May 2015, Oosterhuis announced that he is battling early-onset Alzheimer's disease.

Amateur wins
1966 Berkshire Trophy, British Youths Open Amateur Championship

Professional wins (27)

PGA Tour wins (1)

PGA Tour playoff record (0–1)

European Tour wins (7)

*Note: Tournament shortened to 54/63 holes due to weather.

European Tour playoff record (2–1)

Sunshine Tour wins (3)

Sunshine Tour playoff record (1–0)

European circuit wins (3)

South African circuit wins (3)

Caribbean Tour wins (1)
1973 Ford Maracaibo Open

Other wins (9)
This list may be incomplete.
1969 Sunningdale Foursomes (with Peter Benka)
1970 Lord Derby’s Under-23 Professional Tournament, Coca-Cola Young Professionals' Championship
1971 Southern Professional Championship
1972 Coca-Cola Young Professionals' Championship
1974 Raleigh Cup (Guadalajara, Mexico)
1983 Spalding Invitational
1985 Spalding Invitational
1989 New Jersey PGA Championship

Results in major championships

CUT = missed the half-way cut (3rd round cut in 1981 Open Championship)
"T" indicates a tie for a place

Summary

Most consecutive cuts made – 16 (1975 U.S. Open – 1980 Open Championship)
Longest streak of top-10s – 2 (1975 U.S. Open – 1975 Open Championship)

Team appearances
Amateur
Walker Cup (representing Great Britain & Ireland): 1967
Eisenhower Trophy (representing Great Britain & Ireland): 1968
St Andrews Trophy (representing Great Britain & Ireland): 1968 (winners)
EGA Trophy (representing Great Britain & Ireland): 1967 (winners), 1968 (winners)

Professional
Ryder Cup (representing Great Britain & Ireland/Europe): 1971, 1973, 1975, 1977, 1979, 1981
World Cup (representing England): 1971
Double Diamond International (representing England): 1973, 1974 (winners, captain)
Sotogrande Match: (representing Great Britain and Ireland): 1974 (winners)

See also 

 1974 PGA Tour Qualifying School graduates

References

External links

English male golfers
European Tour golfers
PGA Tour golfers
Ryder Cup competitors for Europe
Golf writers and broadcasters
British sports broadcasters
People educated at Dulwich College
Golfers from London
1948 births
Living people